Krishnanagar  is a village in Chanditala I community development block of Srirampore subdivision in Hooghly district in the Indian state of West Bengal.

Geography

Gram panchayat
Villages and census towns in Masat gram panchayat are: Aushbati, Azabnagar, Banamalipur, Chhunche, Krishnanagar and Masat.

Demographics
As per 2011 Census of India Krishnanagar had a total population of 1,712 of which 875 (51%) were males and 837 (49%) were females. Population below 6 years was 155. The total number of literates in Krishnanagar was 1,191 (76.49% of the population over 6 years).

References

Villages in Chanditala I CD Block